Washington Square is a neighborhood in Brookline, Massachusetts.

Geography
Washington Square is located in North Brookline along Beacon Street. Located 1 mile from Coolidge Corner, the area contains several stores for both shopping and eating. The small hub has attracted several nice restaurants and other unique facilities.

Culture
Washington Square features attractive brownstone buildings which line both sides of Beacon Street and leafy side streets. The Washington Square clock, a green 18-foot Victorian icon, resides in the middle of the Square. Other clocks in Cleveland Circle and Brighton Center have been modeled off the attractive original in Washington Square.

The neighborhood is home to a number of eateries, many of which feature outdoor sidewalk terraces for drinking and dining. 

The Michael Driscoll School, one of Brookline's eight public elementary schools, is located in Washington Square.

Public transportation

Light rail and subway

Washington Square is a stop of the MBTA's Green Line C branch, between Coolidge Corner and Cleveland Circle.

Bus

The MBTA's 65 Bus passes through Washington Square on Washington Street.

References

Brookline, Massachusetts